Judge Dorsey may refer to:

Jennifer A. Dorsey (born 1971), judge of the United States District Court for the District of Nevada
Peter Collins Dorsey (1931–2012), judge of the United States District Court for the District of Connecticut

See also
Justice Dorsey (disambiguation)